Kjeld Thor Tage Otto, Friherre Reedtz-Thott (13 March 1839 – 27 November 1923), was a Danish politician, landowner and member of the Højre political party. He was Council President of Denmark from 1894 to 1897 as the leader of the Reedtz-Thott Cabinet.

Biography
Tage Reedtz-Thott was born at  Gavnø Castle  on the island of Gavnø near Naestved, Denmark. He was the son of the baron Otto Reedtz-Thott (1785-1862) and Karen Julie Elisabeth Frederikke Fønns (1814-1844). He graduated  cand. phil. in 1860. He continued his studies in Geneva and Paris. He took over the Barony Gavnø upon the death of his father in 1862. 
The Barony of Gavnø comprised the estates Gavnø, Lindesvold and Strandegård. 

In 1886,  he was elected to the Folketing and in 1892, became Foreign Minister of Denmark. He became Council President of Denmark
in 1894 and resigned in 1897. He became a member of the Defense Commission in 1902 and in 1906 of the Commission on the Ministry of Foreign Affairs and Diplomacy. He had a seat on the Ecclesiastical Committee in 1904–07. In 1910 he did not receive re-election to the Folketing. He died during 1923 at  Gavnø  and was buried at Vejlø Church (Vejlø Kirke) in Næstved.

Decorations and Honours
Danish

Foreign

References

External links
Monument for Baron Tage Reedtz-Thott 

1839 births
1923 deaths
Prime Ministers of Denmark
Foreign ministers of Denmark
Members of the Landsting (Denmark)
19th-century Danish nobility
20th-century Danish nobility
19th-century Danish politicians
Reedtz family
Thott family